Pastel de choclo ("corn pie" or "corn cake") is a South American dish made from sweetcorn or choclo. It is similar to the pastel de elote found in Mexican cuisine and to the English corn pudding. The filling usually contains ground beef, chicken, raisins, black olives, onions, or slices of hard boiled egg.

Preparation
Pastel de choclo is prepared with sweetcorn ground into a paste. It is then seasoned with ground basil that is blended into the corn. The mixture is pre-cooked with milk and a little lard and used as a topping for the filling. The filling, known as "pino", contains minced beef cooked with onions, paprika, other spices, and sometimes chicken, is also used as a filling for traditional Chilean empanadas. The pino is laid in the bottom of the paila with slices of hard boiled egg, olives and raisins.

In popular culture
The Argentinian poet Florencio Escardó wrote the following ode to pastel de choclo, published in 1876:

See also

 List of maize dishes
 List of porridges

References

Argentine cuisine
Chilean cuisine
Latin American cuisine
Porridges
Maize dishes
Pies
Peruvian cuisine
Paraguayan cuisine
Uruguayan cuisine
Venezuelan_cuisine